Manuel Rodríguez Barrientos (born 17 August 1991) is a Spanish professional basketball player for Covirán Granada of the LEB Oro.

Career
Rodríguez started playing professionally at hometown CB Granada. After the club was dissolved in 2012, he joined CEBA Guadalajara of the LEB Plata. One season later, Rodríguez moved to Amics Castelló, where he spent three years, achieving in 2015 the Copa LEB Plata and promoting to LEB Oro.

In July 2016, Rodríguez moved to Oviedo CB,  where he helped the team to win the Copa Princesa de Asturias.

One year later, Rodríguez came back to Granada, this time to Fundación CB Granada in LEB Plata.

Honours
Oviedo CB
Copa Princesa de Asturias (1): 2017
AB Castelló
Copa LEB Plata (1): 2015

References

External links
Profile at ACB.com
Profile at FEB.es
Profile at MueveteBasket
Profile at RealGM

AB Castelló players
CB Granada players
Fundación CB Granada players
Liga ACB players
Oviedo CB players
Shooting guards
Spanish men's basketball players
1991 births
Living people